Boris Arsenyev (born 7 March 1888, date of death unknown) was a Russian Empire fencer. He competed in the individual sabre event at the 1912 Summer Olympics.

References

External links
 

1888 births
Year of death missing
Male fencers from the Russian Empire
Olympic competitors for the Russian Empire
Fencers at the 1912 Summer Olympics